Rare is the seventh studio album by British rock band Asia, released in 1999 by Resurgence. It was made up of the instrumental music, which keyboard player Geoff Downes and guitarist John Payne composed for the soundtrack for David Attenborough's documentary nature film Salmon: Against the Tides (tracks 1–16) and for an unreleased CD-ROM video game (tracks 17–22). "The Exodus" is an adaptation of the main theme from the film Exodus (1960).

Rare was recorded at the group's new recording studios, Loco Studios, located in Monmouthshire, Wales. It broke the tradition of naming Asia studio recordings with a word beginning and ending with the letter 'a'. However, the next album, Aura (2001), would resume this pattern.

Track listing
 "The Waterfall" – 0:56
 "The Journey Begins" – 1:43
 "The Seasons" – 2:12
 "The Gods" – 1:28
 "The Whales" – 2:16
 "The Journey Continues" – 1:21
 "The Reservation" – 2:58
 "The Bears" – 2:13
 "Under the Seas" – 1:54
 "At the Graveyard" – 1:14
 "Downstream" – 2:17
 "The Ghosts" – 2:56
 "The Sun" – 0:34
 "The Moon" – 1:08
 "The Sharks" – 2:34
 "The Journey Ends" – 0:33
 "The Indians" – 2:55
 "The Angels" – 2:52
 "The Horizons" – 3:13
 "To the Deep" – 3:27
 "The Game" – 3:52
 "The Exodus" – 4:25

Personnel

Asia
 Geoff Downes – keyboards
 John Payne – guitar, bass

Technical personnel
 L-Space Design – design, artwork

References

Asia (band) albums
1999 albums
Electronic albums by English artists
Instrumental albums